Bass River is an unincorporated rural community in western Colchester County, north-central Nova Scotia, in the Maritimes of Canada. It is shares the name of the river located there, that flows into Cobequid Bay.

Location
Bass River is located along an approximate  stretch of Cobequid Bay north shoreline, from the bordering communities of Upper Economy to the west, Porta(u)pique to the east, and Castlereagh in the Cobequid Hills to the north. The community is centred at approximately 45°24' North, 63°46' West. Most of its residents live along or just off of the Trunk 2, the Glooscap Trail. Bass River's jurisdiction is thought locally to extend north from the bay approximately 5 km to include Upper Bass River and Hoeg(')s Corner, east to incorporate Little Bass River (which includes the areas Edgewood and Saint's Rest), and south to include Birch Hill and King's Rest.

Population
Bass River has a population of approximately 300 permanent residents.  The number of residents increases in summertime by 20 to 40 per cent with the influx of those with cottages in the area.

The region suffers from out-migration.  More than half of those who grow up in Bass River leave the area to live, with Halifax, Ontario, Alberta and its petroleum products industry, British Columbia, and the Canadian Forces being common destinations.

Name
The community is named after the small river, Bass River, which runs south from its source in the Cobequid Hills at Upper Bass River, through the village centre, and out to Cobequid Bay.

Industrial heyday
At its height, economic activity in the village of Bass River was centred on wooden furniture production, wooden ship-building, and timber export. The furniture manufacturer Dominion Chair Company employed 40 to 70 workers at any one time from the late 19th century to February 1989, when fire destroyed most of the company's operating facilities. Shipbuilding took place in two locales, at Saint's Rest, site of the (no longer in use) village lighthouse, with the building of the brig 'Jos. Howe' in 1867, and between 1884 and 1918 in Little Bass River with the construction of a further seven wooden ships (Hemeon, 1987). Bass River timber was famously also used to build staging used in construction of the Empire State Building.

Other former industry included grist mill operations, shad fishing, and silica mining. In the early 20th century, there was a bank and a hotel located in the village. The population then was two or three times what it is now.

Present-day economic activity
Present-day economic activity includes a few commercial farms (cultivated strawberries, dairy, and sheep), pulp wood, fire wood, and timber harvesting, lowbush blueberry and Christmas tree production, and clam mollusc harvesting (i.e. "clam digging").

Most present-day residents however commute to assorted work done outside the community. Most commuters go to Truro and its surrounding area.

Heritage and history
Bass River was founded by members of the Ulster emigrant "Judge" James Fulton's family, who himself in c.1767 was the first to settle the area (at King's Rest) a decade after the tragic expulsion of Acadians from the region. Those who settled Bass River and its neighbouring communities were largely of direct Ulster-Scottish descent. Many of these settlers' descendants have remained in the community as is evident from a list of surnames prevalent in the area today. Ulster-Scottish Campbells, Creelmans, Davisons/Davidsons, Fishers, Fultons, McLellans, Starratts/Starritts, Vances, and Wilsons settled the area, as did Lewis's from Scotland.

Other common surnames of the area include Burns, Cameron, Carde, Carr, Cooke, Corbett, Dickie, Faulkner, Fletcher, Gamble, Gilbert, Grue, Jordan, Lawson, McIntosh, Rushton, Rutherford, Smith, Taggart, Taylor, Thompson, and Welch. Most of these names have Ulster-Scottish or Scottish origins, as much of Colchester County was settled by Ulster Scots.

Settlement took place in what was then merely an unnamed parcel of the Township of Londonderry, an area centred on the present-day community of Londonderry. Prior to British settlement, it is believed that Acadian families lived in what are now the neighbouring communities of Economy and Portapique (or Portaupique), places whose names were most likely derived from Acadian French language. Mi'kmaq Indigenous Peoples / First Nations peoples are thought to have hunted and gathered in Colchester County for several hundred years prior to British control and settlement.

Education
West Colchester Consolidated district public school for grades primary to 9 is located on Mines Road, Bass River. (Mines Road, the designated official name, is referred to locally, until it reaches Hoeg's Corner, as "Maple Avenue".) A Chignecto-Central Regional School Board proposal to close the Bass River Elementary school was acted upon in 2013. Prior to this West Colchester Consolidated students in grades primary to 4 attended Bass River Elementary, located on the same road.

References

 S. Ward Hemeon. History of Bass River, Nova Scotia. 1987: (unpublished manuscript)

External links
 Bass River Heritage Society
 Destination: Nova Scotia Maps by Mapeze with a road map of the Bass River area
 Lighthouse Depot online with a photograph and information on Bass River lighthouse

Communities in Colchester County
General Service Areas in Nova Scotia